Malgun Gothic is a Korean sans-serif typeface developed by Sandoll Communications, with hinting by Monotype Imaging, as a replacement of Dotum and Gulim as the default system font for the Korean language version of Windows Vista. It was first shipped with Windows Vista, being available to download later for Windows Server 2008 and Windows XP users. The name "malgun" means "clear" in Korean, thus making a direct translation of the font's name "Clear Gothic."

Characteristics
The font uses Segoe UI for Latin text, while the Korean glyphs are created based on the typeface of Hunminjeongeum, and streamlined with modern form of characters as well as upright and well-regulated strokes. The font supports KS X 1001 character set, but unlike Dotum and Gulim, there are no Han ideographic glyphs (Windows will pull from the Gulim hanja set instead) initially, and the fonts do not include half-width fixed Latin glyphs. There are hanja designed for Malgun Gothic by ChinaType Design, Monotype Imaging Inc. and they were released when Windows 8 released. The glyphs aren't rounded at terminals.

Windows Vista includes two roman weights of the font.

Windows 10 changed glyph characteristics.

Incompatibilities 
Malgun Gothic does not display the backslash  typographical mark. While Segoe UI renders the backslash mark as expected, Malgun Gothic displays the symbol  of the Korean Republic won instead.

See also
East Asian gothic typeface
New Gulim
Sans-serif
Microsoft
List of CJK fonts
Meiryo
Microsoft JhengHei
Microsoft YaHei

References

External links
Microsoft Typography: Malgun Gothic
Korean ClearType fonts for Windows XP
United States Design Patent 528,589 covers Malgun Gothic
United States Design Patent 521,055 covers Malgun Gothic Bold
Sandoll Communications, Inc. page: Korean, English
Sandoll 2008 brochure contains info on Malgun Gothic

Sans-serif typefaces
Windows Vista typefaces
CJK typefaces